Somoniyon is a town in Tajikistan. It is the administrative capital of Rudaki District, one of the Districts of Republican Subordination, lying 17 km south of the national capital of Dushanbe and just east of the river Kofarnihon. The population of the town is 25,200 (January 2020 estimate).

Former names
The village was established in 1938 under the name of imeni Karakhon Sardorova (literally "village named after Karakhon Sardorov"), commemorating one of the prominent figures in the struggle for the Soviet rule against the Basmachi. In 1970, on the occasion of Lenin's 100th anniversary, it was renamed Lenin or Leninskiy. In 1998, it was renamed Somoniyon in honor of the 1100th anniversary of the Samanid Empire. Locals sometimes refer to the village by the historical name Kuktosh or Koktash (Uzbek for "blue stone").

References

External links
 Somoniyon official web site . Retrieved 26 January 2009.

Populated places in Districts of Republican Subordination